St Anne's Church, Kew, is a parish church in Kew in the London Borough of Richmond upon Thames. The building, which dates from 1714, and is Grade II* listed, forms the central focus of Kew Green. The raised churchyard, which is on three sides of the church, has two Grade II* listed monuments – the tombs of the artists Johan Zoffany (d. 1816) and Thomas Gainsborough (d. 1788). The French Impressionist painter Camille Pissarro (1830–1903), who stayed in 1892 at 10 Kew Green, portrayed St Anne's in his painting Church at Kew (1892).

Services
On Sundays the church holds three morning services  – a Said Eucharist in traditional language, Morning Prayer and a Sung Eucharist. An Evening Prayer is held.

Music
The church is used as a venue for concerts, including those of the local orchestra, Kew Sinfonia.

History
Originally built in 1714 on land given by Queen Anne, as a church within the parish of Kingston, St Anne's Church has been extended several times since, as the settlement of Kew grew with royal patronage. In 1770, King George III undertook to pay for the first extension, designed by Joshua Kirby who, four years later, was buried in the churchyard. The church became a parish church in its own right in 1788. In 1805, a new south aisle, designed by Robert Browne, was added, along with a gallery for the royal family's own use. Under King William IV it was further extended in 1837 by  Sir Jeffry Wyattville. A mausoleum designed by the architect Benjamin Ferrey was added in 1851 and an eastern extension, including a dome, in 1882/4. This was to the designs of Henry Stock. Further extensions occurred in 1902, 1979 and 1988. The interior of the roof was repainted in 2013.  To mark the church's tercentenary in 2014, a new baptismal font was installed.

The present parish hall, which is at right angles to the church and incorporates the previous choir vestry, was built in 1978. Its design echoes the materials and forms of the church building.

A collection of funerary hatchments honouring deceased royal or noble parishioners is on display in front of the church's gallery, flanking a rare representation of Queen Anne's coat of arms. A hatchment commemorating George III's son, Ernest Augustus, King of Hanover, was hung in the church in 1821. It is now in the collection of the Museum of Richmond. Inside the church are fine memorials, including ones to the Hooker family.

Just outside the church walls, on the south side, is the Kew war memorial, in the form of a large stone cross, commemorating the local people who fell in the First and Second World Wars. Their names are listed not on the memorial, but in the church.

Events

Baptisms
 Francis Perceval Eliot, soldier, auditor and man of letters, 9 October 1755

Marriages
 Francis, Duke of Teck married Princess Mary Adelaide of Cambridge, 12 June 1866

Burials
 William Aiton (d. 1793), first keeper of the Royal Botanic Gardens, Kew
 Franz Bauer (d. 1840), the Austrian microscopist and botanical artist, whose epitaph also pays tribute to his brother the botanical illustrator Ferdinand Bauer (d. 1826): "In the delineation of plants he [Franz] united the accuracy of a profound naturalist with the skill of the accomplished artist, to a degree which has been only equalled by his brother Ferdinand"
 Professor John Patrick Micklethwait Brenan (d. 1985), British botanist, and director of the Royal Botanic Gardens, Kew
 George Engleheart (d. 1829), painter of portrait miniatures to the Court of King George III
 Thomas Gainsborough (d. 1788), English portrait and landscape painter
 Rev. Thomas Haverfield (d. 1866), chaplain to Prince Augustus Frederick, Duke of Sussex
 Sir William Hooker (d. 1865), director of the Royal Gardens at Kew, and his son, English botanist and explorer Sir Joseph Hooker (d. 1911)
 Joshua Kirby (d. 1774), 18th-century painter known for his work on linear perspective
 Richard Levett (d. 1711), Lord Mayor of London and former owner of Kew Palace; and members of his family, including his grandson, Rev Abraham Blackborne (d. 1797) and his wife Frances, and Lincoln's Inn barrister Levett Blackborne (d. 1781), who sold Kew Palace to the Royal family
 Jeremiah Meyer (d. 1789), English miniature painter
 John Smith (d. 1888), botanist and the first curator at the Royal Botanic Gardens, Kew
 Johan Zoffany (d. 1810), German neoclassical painter active in England

Formerly buried at St Anne's
 Prince Adolphus, Duke of Cambridge and his wife Princess Augusta of Hesse-Kassel were buried at the east end of the church in 1850 and 1889 respectively, but in 1930 their remains were exhumed and buried at St George's Chapel, Windsor Castle.

Gallery

Church exterior

Church interior

Tombs and memorials

See also
 The Barn Church, Kew
 Kew Mortuary
 St Luke's Church, Kew
 Anthony Saxton

References

External links

 Official website
 
 
 The Friends of St Anne's Church, Kew
 Speel, Bob: Kew Church Monuments (Monuments at St Anne's)

Further reading
 
 
 
 
 
 
 
 

1714 establishments in England
18th-century Church of England church buildings
Kew
Anne, Queen of Great Britain
Church buildings with domes
Kew
Churches in Kew
Kew
Grade II* listed monuments and memorials
History of the London Borough of Richmond upon Thames
Jeffry Wyatville buildings
Kew Green
Camille Pissarro
Royal Botanic Gardens, Kew
World War I memorials in England
World War II memorials in England